Grey's Mood is an album by trombonist Al Grey recorded in Paris at sessions in 1973 and 1975 and released on the French Black and Blue label in 1979.

Reception 

The Allmusic review stated "This excellent set features Al Grey on two sessions in peak form. The trombonist is the lead voice in an octet for four numbers that also feature tenorman Hal Singer, and he joins forces with tenor saxophonist Jimmy Forrest (they were both in Count Basie's band at the time) in a quintet also including pianist Tommy Flanagan for three other tunes. ... Accessible and swinging music".

Track listing 
All compositions by Al Grey except where noted
 "Face It Here It Is" – 5:08
 "Night Train" (Jimmy Forrest) – 5:10 Bonus track on CD reissue
 "Catch Up With That" – 3:17
 "Solitude" (Duke Ellington, Eddie DeLange, Irving Mills) – 3:32 Bonus track on CD reissue
 "Grey's Mood" – 6:24
 "Drums on Chris" – 3:00
 "Bedroom Eyes" – 7:07
 "Something for Grey" (Claude Gousset) – 6:36
 " Shufflin' in Orange's Arenes" – 2:27 Bonus track on CD reissue
 "Mellow for Love" – 8:54
 "Catch Up With That" [alternate take] – 3:25 Bonus track on CD reissue
Recorded at Barclay Studio in Paris, France, on April 3, 1973  (tracks 4–6, 8 & 9) and October 7, 1975  (tracks 1–3, 7, 10 & 11)

Personnel 
Al Grey – trombone
Xavier Chambon – trumpet (tracks 4–6, 8 & 9)
Claude Gousset – trombone (tracks 4–6, 8 & 9)
Michel Attenoux – alto saxophone (tracks 4–6, 8 & 9)
Jimmy Forrest (tracks 1–3, 7, 10 & 11), Hal Singer (tracks 4–6, 8 & 9) – tenor saxophone
Tommy Flanagan – piano (tracks 1–3, 7, 10 & 11)
Stan Hunter – organ (tracks 4–6, 8 & 9)
Clarence "Gatemouth" Brown – guitar  (tracks 4–6, 8 & 9)
John Duke – bass (tracks 1–3, 7, 10 & 11)
Chris Columbus (tracks 4–6, 8 & 9), Bobby Durham (tracks 1–3, 7, 10 & 11) – drums

References 

1979 albums
Al Grey albums
Black & Blue Records albums